Thomas Stephen McMahon (born July 12, 1969) is an American football coach serving as the special teams coordinator for the Las Vegas Raiders of the National Football League.

Coaching career

Falcons
In 2007 McMahon made the jump to the NFL as an assistant special teams coordinator for the Falcons.

Rams
From 2009 until 2011 he worked as the special teams coordinator for the Rams.

Chiefs
In 2012 he worked as the special teams coordinator for the Chiefs.

Colts
From 2013 to 2017 McMahon worked as the Colts special teams coordinator.

Broncos
From 2018 to 2021 McMahon was the special teams coordinator for the Broncos.

Raiders
On February 7, 2022, McMahon joined Josh McDaniels inaugural Raider’s staff as the team’s special teams coordinator.

Personal life
He is the father of Emmett McMahon, nicknamed "Mitt", producer of The Pat McAfee Show and executive producer of the Hammer DAHN sports gambling podcast.

References

External links 
 Denver Broncos bio

1969 births
Living people
Coaches of American football from Montana
Carroll Fighting Saints football coaches
High school football coaches in Montana
Utah State Aggies football coaches
Louisville Cardinals football coaches
Atlanta Falcons coaches
St. Louis Rams coaches
Kansas City Chiefs coaches
Indianapolis Colts coaches
Denver Broncos coaches
Las Vegas Raiders coaches